David Brent Keuning (born March 28, 1976) is an American musician, best known for his role as the lead guitarist of the rock band The Killers, which he founded alongside Brandon Flowers in 2001 and with whom he has recorded six studio albums. Keuning played every show with The Killers since its inception up until the show at Chicago's Lollapalooza in August 2017. From 2017 to the end of 2020, Keuning was on hiatus from the band. He returned to The Killers to help record their 2021 album Pressure Machine. Keuning released a solo album titled Prismism under his surname Keuning in 2019.

Personal life 
David Brent Keuning was born and brought up in Pella, Iowa by parents Charles and Sandra. He has one older brother, Kevin Keuning. He started to play guitar just before entering Pella Community High School where he played in the jazz band. In his senior year the group won state champions class 3A. In 2000 Keuning moved to Las Vegas, Nevada. He found work at the Banana Republic store in The Venetian Hotel and Casino on The Strip.

David Brent Keuning married Emilie Keuning on October 20th, 2018. He has one son, Kyler Keuning, born September 17th, 2005.

Career 
Keuning placed an ad in the local Las Vegas Weekly looking to form a band, mentioning Oasis as one of his influences. Brandon Flowers, who shared Keuning's love of groups such as New Order and the Cure, answered it, only to have Keuning promptly hand him a TASCAM-recorded four-track demo of "Mr. Brightside".

Keuning announced in August 2017 that he would not be joining the band to tour in supporting their fifth studio album, Wonderful Wonderful, although he would remain a member of the group. Keuning did not contribute to The Killers' sixth album, Imploding the Mirage, but joined the band again in studio in early 2021 to work on their seventh album, Pressure Machine.

He debuted his solo music with the release of his first single "Restless Legs" under the moniker Keuning. The assemblage of new music, created by Keuning in his San Diego home studio, was taken from hundreds of voice memos that he stockpiled while on tour with the Killers over the previous decade that evolved into songs. Keuning's debut album, Prismism, was released on January 25, 2019, and is a collection of 14 tracks with almost all instruments played by Keuning himself.

Playing style 

Keuning is noted as a guitarist for playing anthemic and soaring solos in addition to sweetened and often percussive style playing frequently. He is also noted for his "unusual voicings" and "digit-distending, string-skipping" finger work on the guitar in similar fashion of Andy Summers of The Police.

Keuning was featured in Guitarist magazine in May 2009 and Guitar World in February 2009, Guitar Player in January 2008 and February 2010, and Guitar Aficionado in January 2013.

In 2010, Keuning's guitar riff in "Mr. Brightside" was voted at number 9 in Total Guitars 50 greatest riffs of the 21st Century so far.

 Influences 
Keuning cites influences such as The Edge, Robert Smith, Bernard Sumner, Billy Corgan, Jimi Hendrix, Keith Richards, George Harrison, Angus Young, and Mick Mars.

 Equipment Guitars Gibson ES-335
 Fender Starcaster
 Ibanez Destroyer
 Gibson Flying V
 Gibson Les Paul Custom
 Fender Stratocaster
 Gibson J45
 Ibanez AE Classical Guitar
 Gibson Explorer
 Fender Jazz BassSound equipment Furman AR15 Voltage Regulator
 Axess Electronics FX1+ expansion board, midi foot controllers w/ Axess CFX4 control function switchers and custom made Axess Electronics Deville footswitch interfaces
 Lectrosonics Wireless Units
 Zaolla Artist and Zaolla Silverline series cables as cables and cable snakes
 (2) duplicate FX racks are wired up w/Mogami Cable
 Pedals, in Voodoo Lab GCX Audio Switcher Loops: Keeley Mod Ibanez  TS9 (phat mod and baked mod)(x2), Boss DD6 Digital Delay, MXR Phase 100 (x2), Electro Harmonix Keeley Mod Big Muff Pi, Ibanez AD99 Keeley Mod Delay, Ibanez AC99 Keeley Mod Chorus, Digitech Whammy, TRex RoommSpate Reverb, and Buff Puff Boost. And for the acoustic: Fishman Aura Classical Pedal, Fishman Aura Dreadnought Pedal

Picks: Dunlop Nylon – 0.60mm, 0.73mm, 1.00mmAmplifiers Fender Deville 2x12" (x2)
 Hiwatt DG103 Head and Hiwatt 4x12" Speaker Cabinet

NOTE: Hiwatt currently are one of Keuning's sponsors.

 Discography 

 Keuning 
 Prismism (Thirty Tigers, 2019)
 A Mild Case of Everything (Pretty Faithful Records, 2021)Other appearances'
"Welcome to Fabulous Las Vegas" – Brandon Flowers (2010)
"Wander" – We Are Hyena (2012)
"This Is a Joke" (2014) – Bombay Heavy
"Clouds Pretend" – The Hunt (2014)
"Heavy Hand," "Goodbye Cambridge" – Blackout Balter (2016)

Awards and nominations

References

External links 
Dave Keuning's official website
 

1976 births
Living people
American rock bass guitarists
American male bass guitarists
Musicians from Iowa City, Iowa
The Killers members
People from Pella, Iowa
Guitarists from Iowa
American male guitarists
21st-century American bass guitarists
Thirty Tigers artists